is a retired Japanese football player and Japanese football manager and who is the currently assistant head coach Thai League 2 club of Phrae United.

Honour
Thai Honda FC

Thai Division 1 League Champion; 2016

References

External links
 
 Daiki Higuchi Interview (1)
 Daiki Higuchi Interview (2)

1984 births
Living people
Japanese footballers
Japanese expatriate footballers
Daiki Higuchi
Daiki Higuchi
J3 League players
Expatriate footballers in Thailand
Japanese expatriate sportspeople in Thailand
Association football defenders